Shri Hanuman Jakhu, deemed to be as the Pride of Shimla, is a statue of Lord Hanuman situated under the periphery of Jakhu Temple on Jakhu Hill in Shimla. It is one of the tallest statues in the world with the height of 33 metres (108 feet).

Legacy 
The statue is built on the Jakhu Hill which is the highest hill out of the seven hills of Shimla. Its construction was started in 2008 and completed in the year 2010, inaugurated and built by the Managing Director of JHS Svendgaard Laboratories Ltd, the largest oral-care manufacturing Company in India, Nikhil Nanda and the then Chief Minister of Himachal Pradesh, Prem Kumar Dhumal. The staue is a gift by the HC Nanda Charitable Trust to the state.
The statue is 108 feet tall and overlooks the city of Shimla from the 8,850 foot hilltop. In comparison, it surpasses the Brazil's, Christ the Redeemer statue which is  98 feet tall. It has been filed in the Guinness Book of World Record as the tallest Statue of Shri Hanuman in the world. The statue towers high above the trees and is visible from several points in Shimla.
The area around the statue has been developed so that visiting families can spend time comfortably here. A park is built with swings and slides is located nearby. Many devotees from different parts of the nation come and visit the temple everyday to seek strenghth peace and sanity.

View 
The statue can be seen from all parts of the city as well as from Solan.

Gallery

References 

Colossal statues in India
Tourist attractions in Shimla
Tourist attractions in Himachal Pradesh
2010 sculptures
2010 establishments in Himachal Pradesh
Architecture in India
Shimla